Carolin Simon (born 24 November 1992) is a German football player for Bayern Munich and the Germany national team.

Career

Club
Carolin Simon began her career with the GSV Eintracht Baunatal and moved in the summer of 2008 to third division TSV Jahn Calden. On 1 January 2010 she joined the Bundesliga team Hamburger SV for which she disputed 48 top-flight appearances, in the following two and a half years, during which reach six goals. After the HSV descended to Regionalliga in the summer of 2012, Simon signed for season 2012/13 with VfL Wolfsburg. However, In Wolfsburg she came in only two DFB Pokal matches as well as for the second team. In January 2013, the club announced the cancellation of the contract by mutual consent. Shortly thereafter, was announced that Simon has a valid contract with Bayer 04 Leverkusen (until 30 June 2016). In Leverkusen she was regularly starting lineup in the following three and a half years and was able to win with the team in 2015 the last DFB-Hallenpokal. After expiry of her contract Simon joined the season 2016/17 for SC Freiburg.

National team
For the national team Simon played since 2007 in the age groups U-15 to U-20. With latter, she participated in the 2012 FIFA U-20 Women's World Cup, where the team conceded only one goal; in 0: 1 lost final against the selection of USA. Previously, Simon won in 2008 and 2009 the UEFA Women's Under-17 Championship. She also won in 2011 the UEFA Women's Under-19 Championship.

International goals
Scores and results list Germany's goal tally first:

Honours

Club
Bayer 04 Leverkusen
DFB-Hallenpokal: Winner 2015

Olympique Lyon
Division 1 Féminine: Winner 2018–19
Coupe de France Féminine: Winner 2018–19
UEFA Women's Champions League: Winner 2018–19

Bayern Munich
Frauen-Bundesliga: 2020-21

International
Germany U-17
UEFA Women's Under-17 Championship: Winner 2008, 2009
FIFA U-17 Women's World Cup: Third place 2008

Germany U-19
UEFA Women's Under-19 Championship: Winner 2011

Germany U-20
FIFA U-20 Women's World Cup: Runners-up 2012

References

External links

1992 births
German women's footballers
German expatriate sportspeople in France
Germany women's international footballers
Expatriate women's footballers in France
Women's association football forwards
Hamburger SV (women) players
VfL Wolfsburg (women) players
Bayer 04 Leverkusen (women) players
SC Freiburg (women) players
Living people
Sportspeople from Kassel
Frauen-Bundesliga players
Footballers from Hesse
2019 FIFA Women's World Cup players
Olympique Lyonnais Féminin players
Division 1 Féminine players
FC Bayern Munich (women) players
UEFA Women's Euro 2017 players